Jordy Zuidam (born 8 July 1980) is a Dutch former professional footballer who played as a midfielder.

Zuidam was born in Utrecht.  During his football career, he played for FC Utrecht, Go Ahead Eagles and FC Zwolle, before he started playing for Katwijk in the Dutch Topklasse. In May 2013, Zuidam stopped playing football and started a new career as head scouting for his former team FC Utrecht.

Honours
Utrecht
KNVB Cup: 2002–03, 2003–04
Johan Cruyff Shield: 2004

References

External links
 

1980 births
Living people
Dutch footballers
FC Utrecht players
Go Ahead Eagles players
PEC Zwolle players
Eredivisie players
Eerste Divisie players
Footballers from Utrecht (city)
VV Katwijk players
Association football midfielders